Etofamide (INN, also known as eticlordifene) is an antiprotozoal drug used in the treatment of amoebiasis.

Its effect against Giardia lamblia has been described as modest.

References 

Antiprotozoal agents
Nitrobenzenes
Organochlorides
Phenol ethers